Peter von Glehn (in Jelgimeggi Manor –  in Saint Petersburg) was a Baltic German botanist.

Peter von Glehn was born in the Jelgimeggi manor in 1835, to a Baltic German landowner, member of the Glehn family, Peter von Glehn (1796–1843) and Auguste Caroline Marie Burchart von Bellavary, member of the Burchardt family who took care of the Town Hall Pharmacy in Reval. He had 2 younger brothers: Nikolai (1841–1923), the founder of Nömme, and Len von Glehn, (1844-1920), and 3 sisters: Marie Elisabeth (1840–????), Julie Wilhelmine (1842–1867) and Marie (1843–1884).

He graduated at the University of Dorpat with a gold medal.

Glehn's Spruce (Picea glehnii), a species of conifer in the family Pinaceae, is named after Peter von Glehn.

See also
 List of Baltic German scientists

References

1835 births
1876 deaths
People from Saku Parish
People from Kreis Harrien
Baltic-German people
19th-century botanists from the Russian Empire
University of Tartu alumni